Hildegard Goss-Mayr (born 22 January 1930, Vienna) is an Austrian nonviolent activist and Christian theologian.

Life and commitment
Daughter of Kaspar Mayr, founder of the Austrian branch of the International Fellowship of Reconciliation, she studied Philosophy in Vienna and New Haven.  In 1958, she married Jean Goss (1912–1991), a French peace activist; the couple had two children, Myriam and Etienne.

She and her husband were in Rome during the Council Vatican II lobbying for the recognition of the conscientious objection by the Roman Catholic Church. In the 1960s/70s, they lived and worked for some time in South America, training groups in active nonviolence and helping in the creation of the SERPAJ, whose first coordinator was Adolfo Pérez Esquivel. They trained others groups in active nonviolence in many countries, in Europe, Asia, Middle East and Africa. They participated in the preparation of the People Power Revolution in Philippines in 1986.

Jean Goss and Hildegard Goss-Mayr shared several Peace Prizes, included the Bruno Kreisky Award in Austria in 1979, the Pax Christi USA Pope Paul VI Teacher of Peace Award in 1986, and the Pfeffer Peace Prize in 1990.

In 1991, Goss-Mayr has also won the Niwano Peace Prize, in Japan, and, in 2009, the Pacem in Terris Peace and Freedom Award, from the Diocese of Davenport, Iowa. She is currently the honorary president of the International Fellowship of Reconciliation.

She was nominated for the Nobel Peace Prize in 1979, in 1987 and in 2005 among the « 1000 women for the  Nobel Peace Prize 2005 » by PeaceWomen Across the Globe.

Bibliography
 Une autre révolution. Violence des non-violents, Paris, Cerf, 1969.
 Der Mensch vor dem Unrecht. Spiritualität und Praxis. Gewaltlose Befreiung, Vienna, 1976.
 Gérard Hoover, Jean et Hildegard Goss-Mayr, La non-violence, c'est la vie, Arudis, Utovie, 1986.
 Évangile et luttes de paix, Paris, Bergers et Mages, 1989.
 Friede braucht Bewegung. Analysen und Perspektiven der Friedensbewegung in Österreich, with Thomas Roithner and Pete Hämmerle.
 Oser le combat non-violent aux côtés de Jean Goss, Paris, Cerf, 1998, preface by cardinal Franz König.
 With Jo Hanssens, Jean Goss. Mystique et militant de la non-violence, Namur, Fidélité, 2010, preface by Adolfo Pérez Esquivel.

Biography

 Richard Deats, Marked for life. The story of Hildegard Goss-Mayr, Hyde Park (NY), New City Press, 2009.

See also
 List of peace activists

References

External links
 Catholic Peace Fellowship article on her and her husband
 Hildegard Goss-Mayr: The greatest living peacemaker by US pacifist John Dear, SJ, in National Catholic Reporter, 3 Feb. 2009

1930 births
Living people
20th-century Austrian Roman Catholic theologians
Writers from Vienna
Austrian anti-war activists
Nonviolence advocates
Pfeffer Peace Prize laureates
21st-century Austrian Roman Catholic theologians